The Colletidae are a family of bees, and are often referred to collectively as plasterer bees or polyester bees, due to the method of smoothing the walls of their nest cells with secretions applied with their mouthparts; these secretions dry into a cellophane-like lining. The five subfamilies, 54 genera, and over 2000 species are all (with the known exception of but one species, Amphylaeus morosus) evidently solitary, though many nest in aggregations. Two of the subfamilies, Euryglossinae and Hylaeinae, lack the external pollen-carrying apparatus (the scopa) that otherwise characterizes most bees, and instead carry the pollen in their crops. These groups, and most genera in this family, have liquid or semiliquid pollen masses on which the larvae develop.

They can be found all over the world, but the most species live in South America and Australia. Over 50% of all bee species living in Australia belong to this family. Only the genera Colletes and Hylaeus can be found in Europe, while in North America, in addition to these two, the genera Caupolicana, Eulonchopria, and Ptiloglossa are found.

Australian genera include Euhesma, a large genus, members of which has been split off into other genera such as Euryglossa and Callohesma.

Traditionally, this family is believed to be likely the most "primitive" among extant bees, based primarily on the similarities of their mouthparts (the unique possession among bees of a bilobed glossa) to those of Crabronidae (the putative ancestors of bees), but recent molecular studies have disproved this hypothesis, placing the Melittidae (sensu lato) as the basal group of bees.

"Nocturnal" species
The Colletidae are one of the four bee families that contain some crepuscular species (of both the "vespertine" and "matinal" types). These bees, as is typical in such cases, have greatly enlarged ocelli. The other families with some crepuscular species are Andrenidae, Halictidae, and Apidae.

Systematics
Subfamily Colletinae — worldwide
Tribe Paracolletini
Brachyglossula
Callomelitta
Chrysocolletes
Eulonchopria
Glossurocolletes
Hesperocolletes
Hesperocolletes douglasi
Leioproctus
Lonchopria
Lonchorhyncha
Neopasiphae
Niltonia
Paracolletes
Phenacolletes
Trichocolletes
Tribe Colletini
Colletes
Mourecotelles
Tribe Scraptrini
Scrapter
Subfamily Diphaglossinae — Americas
Tribe Caupolicanini
Caupolicana
Crawfordapis
Ptiloglossa
Tribe Diphaglossini
Cadeguala
Cadegualina
Diphaglossa
Tribe Dissoglottini
Mydrosoma
Mydrosomella
Ptiloglossidia
Subfamily Xeromelissinae — tropical Americas
Chilicola
Chilimelissa
Geodiscelis
Xenochilicola
Xeromelissa

Subfamily Hylaeinae — yellow-faced bees, worldwide
Amphylaeus
Calloprosopis
Hemirhiza
Hylaeus
Hyleoides
Meroglossa
Palaeorhiza
Xenorhiza
Subfamily Euryglossinae — Australian
Brachyhesma
Callohesma
Dasyhesma
Euhesma
Euryglossa
Euryglossina
Euryglossula
Heterohesma
Hyphesma
Melittosmithia
Pachyprosopis
Sericogaster
Stenohesma
Tumidihesma
Xanthesma

References

External links
 Image Gallery from Gembloux
 Online identification guides to Eastern North American Colletidae

 
Bee families
Taxa named by Amédée Louis Michel le Peletier